Agarkhed  is a village in the southern state of Karnataka, India. It is located in the Indi taluk of Bijapur district in Karnataka.

Demographics
 India census, Agarkhed had a population of 5667 with 2907 males and 2760 females.

History
Agarkhed was owned by the Adya Jahagirdar family. This has been documented in the Adya Vamsha Pradeepa.

See also
 Bijapur
 Districts of Karnataka

References

External links
 http://Bijapur.nic.in/ 

Villages in Bijapur district, Karnataka